State Road 263 (SR 263) is a north–south route that forms the western portion of Capital Circle, Tallahassee's "beltway".

The route runs from State Road 363 (Woodville Highway), taking over from the hidden State Road 261 to its east.  it then runs west, separating from US 319 at State Road 61/Crawfordville Highway, where SR 263 is signed from here to the northern terminus.  It runs west, where after an intersection with County Road 2203, it passes by the northern end of Tallahassee Regional Airport, where the road then turns north, leaving airport grounds at the intersection of SR 371.  It continues north, towards US 90 and I-10 before ending at US 27 northwest of Tallahassee.

Major intersections

Related route

Former State Road 263A, now County Road 0356, also known as Fred George Road, is an east–west route in northwestern Tallahassee, Florida, United States, connecting US 27 (Monroe Street) with State Road 263 (Capital Circle).

The Fred George Basin Greenway is located adjacent to the road, between Capital Circle and the CSX railroad.

References

263
263